Kevin Kapstad (born February 12, 1986) is an American former professional ice hockey defenseman.

Playing career
Undrafted, Kapstad played collegiate hockey with the University of New Hampshire in the Hockey East. At the completion of his senior year, Kapstad embarked upon a European career signing in the 2nd Bundesliga with SC Riessersee and later EV Landshut.

On April 27, 2012, Kapstad left Germany and signed with Leksands IF of the then HockeyAllsvenskan. In the 2012–13 season, Kapstad contributed with 38 points in 52 games to help Leksands gain promotion to the Swedish Hockey League.  Kapstad made his SHL debut playing with Leksands during the 2013–14 SHL season.

After three seasons with Leksands, Kapstad left Sweden as a free agent and signed a two-year contract with Austrian club, EC KAC of the EBEL on June 18, 2015.

References

External links

1986 births
Living people
American men's ice hockey defensemen
EHC Black Wings Linz players
EV Landshut players
Leksands IF players
Ice hockey players from Massachusetts
EC KAC players
New Hampshire Wildcats men's ice hockey players
SC Riessersee players